Porto Pride is the name of the lesbian, gay, bisexual, and transgender community Pride Party held in Porto in July of each year. The first Porto LGBT Pride Party was in July 2001. Around 1000 people participated in the first edition and this number doubled in the 2008 edition. The Party is an event supported by commercial entities. It included a community side, where dozens of associations and groups promoted their activities, as  well as a charity twist. A significant part of the revenue is donated to a local institution. In 2007 the donation was almost 4,500 euros.

Since 2006 an LGBT Pride Parade has also been held in Porto. During the first parade almost 500 people participated.

Porto Pride 2011 is planned for 9 July.

See also
Lisbon Gay & Lesbian Film Festival
Gay pride
Gay pride parade

References

External links
 Porto Pride

Pride parades in Europe
LGBT events in Portugal
Events in Porto
Parades in Portugal
Annual events in Portugal
Cultural festivals in Portugal
Recurring events established in 2001
2001 establishments in Portugal
Summer events in Portugal